Low-specificity L-threonine aldolase (LtaE) is an enzyme with systematic name L-threonine/L-allo-threonine acetaldehyde-lyase (glycine-forming). This enzyme catalyses the following chemical reaction

 (1) L-threonine  glycine + acetaldehyde
 (2) L-allothreonine  glycine + acetaldehyde

This enzyme requires pyridoxal phosphate.

References

External links 
 

EC 4.1.2